Calì, also written in English as Cali, is an Italian surname, widespread mainly in the Ionian side of Sicily.
The origin of surname Calì is thought to be from the Greek word kalos (beautiful), or from its Sanskrit root kali (time).

Notable people with the name Cali:

Surname

Italy
 Aimone Calì (born 1997), an Italian football player
 Davide Cali (born 1972), a Swiss-born Italian writer
 Francesco Calì (1882–1949), Italian footballer, first captain of the Italian national team
 Gaetano Emanuel Calì (1885–1936), Italian composer and orchestra conductor
 Gennaro Calì (c. 1799–1877) an Italian sculptor
 Giulio Calì (1895–1967), Italian actor
 Giuseppe Calì (golfer) (born 1952), Italian golfer
 Pina Calì (1905–1949), an Italian painter
 Vincenza Calì (born 1983), Italian track and field athlete

United States
 Carmen Cali (born 1978), American baseball player
 Frank Cali (1965–2019), American mobster
 John J. Cali (1918–2014), American real estate developer
 Joseph Cali (born 1950), American actor

Other countries
 Giuseppe Calì (1846–1930), Maltese painter
 Jua Cali (born 1979), Kenyan musician

Given name

Somalia
 Ali Bu'ul or Cali Bucul, a poet
 Ali Mahdi Muhammad or Cali Mahdi Maxamed, an entrepreneur and politician
 Ali Mohamed Gedi or Cali Maxamed Geedi, a past Prime Minister

United States
 Cali Carranza, a Tejano musician
 Cali Doe or Tammy Jo Alexander, a homicide victim found in the town of Caledonia, New York
 Cali Farquharson, a professional soccer player
 Cali Thornhill DeWitt or Michael Cali DeWitt, an artist
 Luria Petrucci or Cali Lewis, a podcaster

Other countries
 Cali Timmins (born 1963), a Canadian actress

See also

 
 
Cali (disambiguation)
Cari (name)
Carli (given name)

Italian-language surnames